Senator Murray may refer to:

Australia
Andrew Murray (Australian politician) (born 1947), Senator for Western Australia (1996–2008)
Reg Murray (1909–1962), Senator for Tasmania (1947–1951)
Murray Watt (1973-), Senator for Queensland (2016-)

Scotland
John Murray, Lord Murray (1778–1859), Senator of the College of Justice

United States
Members of the U.S. Senate
James E. Murray (1876–1961), senator from Montana (1934–1961)
Patty Murray (1950–), senator from Washington (1992–)

United States state senate members
Ed Murray (Washington politician) (born 1955), Washington State Senate
Edwin R. Murray (born 1960), Louisiana State Senate
Florence K. Murray (1916–2004), Rhode Island State Senate
John S. Murray (Iowa politician) (born 1939), Iowa State Senate
John S. Murray (Washington politician) (1925–2007), Washington State Senate
Kevin Murray (politician) (born 1960), California State Senate
Martin L. Murray (1909–1990), Pennsylvania State Senate
Milton T. Murray (1898–1991), Wisconsin State Senate
Robert Murray (Maine politician) (born 1959), Maine State Senate
Therese Murray (born 1947), Massachusetts State Senate
William J. Murray (politician) (1884–1966), New York State Senate
William Pitt Murray (1825–1910), Minnesota State Senate

See also
Murray (surname)